Ángel García (born 5 January 1967) is a retired Cuban pole vaulter.

Highly successful on the regional scene, he won the gold medals at the 1989 Central American and Caribbean Championships, the 1990 Central American and Caribbean Games as well as the 1993 and 1995 Central American and Caribbean Championships. He won the bronze medal at the 1991 Pan American Games.

His personal best jump was 5.65 metres, achieved in June 1992 in Havana.

References

1967 births
Living people
Cuban male pole vaulters
Competitors at the 1990 Central American and Caribbean Games
Central American and Caribbean Games gold medalists for Cuba
Pan American Games medalists in athletics (track and field)
Athletes (track and field) at the 1991 Pan American Games
Pan American Games bronze medalists for Cuba
Central American and Caribbean Games medalists in athletics
Medalists at the 1991 Pan American Games
21st-century Cuban people
20th-century Cuban people